Zaza is a rural locality (a selo) in Kontsilsky Selsoviet, Khivsky District, Republic of Dagestan, Russia. The population was 38 as of 2010.

Geography 
Zaza is located 28 km northeast of Khiv (the district's administrative centre) by road. Chere is the nearest rural locality.

References 

Rural localities in Khivsky District